Littlepage Stone Mansion, also known as The Old Stone Mansion, is a historic home located at Charleston, West Virginia.  It was constructed in 1845 is one of only six houses within the City of Charleston that date to before the American Civil War.  It was originally constructed as a two-story Federal style residence, with additions and improvements made in 1915 and 1936.

It was listed on the National Register of Historic Places in 1982.

References

External links

Houses in Charleston, West Virginia
Federal architecture in West Virginia
Houses completed in 1845
Houses on the National Register of Historic Places in West Virginia
National Register of Historic Places in Charleston, West Virginia
Stone houses in West Virginia
Historic American Buildings Survey in West Virginia